The  was fought from 4 to 10 May 1869, between the remnants of the Tokugawa shogunate navy, consolidated into the armed forces of the rebel Ezo Republic, and the newly formed Imperial Japanese Navy. It was one of the last stages of Battle of Hakodate during the Boshin War, and occurred near Hakodate in the northern Japanese island of Hokkaidō.

Ezo Republic forces
The naval forces of the Ezo Republic were grouped around the warship Kaiten. The fleet originally consisted of eight steamships: Kaiten, Banryū, Japanese gunboat Chiyoda, Chōgei, Kaiyō Maru, Kanrin Maru, Mikaho and Shinsoku.

However, Kaiyō Maru and Shinsoku had been lost in a previous engagement in front of Esashi, and Kanrin Maru had been captured by Imperial forces after suffering damage in bad weather. The loss of these three major units seriously weakened the Ezo Republic side.

Imperial forces
For the operation, an Imperial Japanese Navy fleet had been rapidly constituted around the recently acquired ironclad warship Kōtetsu (the former CSS Stonewall), which had been purchased from the United States. Other Imperial ships were Kasuga, Hiryū, Teibō No.1, and Mōshun, which had been supplied by the domains of Saga, Chōshū and Satsuma to the newly formed Meiji government in 1868.

The nascent Imperial government started with a much weaker navy than that of the Ezo Republic, both in terms of vessel strength, unity (most of its ships were borrowed from Western domains), and training. However the loss of two major units on the Ezo side previous to the main action (Kaiyō Maru and Kanrin Maru), and most of all, the incorporation of the revolutionary Kōtetsu since April 1868 on the Imperial side (a ship originally ordered by the Tokugawa shogunate but withheld by the United States during the main conflict under a policy of neutrality taken by foreign nation and finally delivered to the newly formed government), turned the tables. In addition, the Imperial government received the support of two transportation ships chartered by the United States for the transportation of its troops.

Combat
[[Image:Warship Banryu bombards and sinks Choyo 1869 Naval Battle of Hakodate.png|thumb|200px|left|Banryū destroying the Imperial warship Chōyō in the 1869 Naval Battle of Hakodate Bay.]]
The Imperial fleet supported the deployment of troops on the island of Hokkaidō, destroyed onshore fortifications and attacked the rebel ships. On 4 May Chiyoda was captured by Imperial forces after having been abandoned in a grounding and on 7 May Kaiten was heavily hit and put out of action. Banryū managed to sink the Imperial forces' Chōyō, but Banryū later sank in turn because of heavy damage.

The Imperial Japanese Navy won the engagement, ultimately leading to the surrender of the Republic of Ezo at the end of May 1869.

Ships of foreign navies — the British HMS Pearl and the French Coetlogon — were standing by neutrally during the conflict. The French captain Jules Brunet who had trained the rebels and helped organize their defenses, surrendered on Coetlogon on 8 June.

The future Admiral of the fleet Tōgō Heihachirō participated in the battle on the Imperial side as a young third-class officer, onboard Kasuga.

References

Bibliography
Ballard C. B., Vice-Admiral G. A. The Influence of the Sea on the Political History of Japan. London: John Murray, 1921.
Jentschura, Hansgeorg; Dieter Jung, Peter Mickel.  Warships of the Imperial Japanese Navy, 1869–1945. United States Naval Institute, Annapolis, Maryland, USA; 1977. .
Onodera Eikō, Boshin Nanboku Senso to Tohoku Seiken''. Sendai: Kita no Sha, 2004.

External links
Bakumatsu navies

Naval battles of the Boshin War
1869 in Japan
Conflicts in 1869
May 1869 events